Yegor Dmitriyevich Generalov (born 24 January 1993) is a Russian football player who plays for Isloch Minsk Raion.

Club career
He made his professional debut in the Russian Professional Football League for FC Saturn Ramenskoye on 8 August 2014 in a game against FC Domodedovo Moscow.

He made his Russian Football National League debut for FC Dynamo Saint Petersburg on 8 July 2017 in a game against FC Yenisey Krasnoyarsk.

Career statistics

References

External links
 
 
 

1993 births
Belarusian emigrants to Russia
People from Smarhon’
Living people
Russian footballers
Russia youth international footballers
Russia under-21 international footballers
Association football goalkeepers
Russian expatriate footballers
Expatriate footballers in Belarus
FC Dynamo Moscow reserves players
FC Saturn Ramenskoye players
FC Dynamo Saint Petersburg players
FC SKA-Khabarovsk players
FC Khimki players
FC Minsk players
FC Isloch Minsk Raion players
Russian First League players
Russian Second League players